Princess Sofia Alekseevna Dolgorukova (Russian: Софья Алексеевна Долгорукова; 1887–1949), née Countess Bobrinskaya (house of Bobrinsky), was a Russian surgeon, pilot and racing driver. Daughter of Aleksei Aleksandrovich Bobrinsky. She was one of the first female racing drivers and pilots in the Russian Empire and the world. She served as a pilot in the First World War after the Russian Provisional Government had allowed women to serve in warfare in 1917. Sofka Skipwith was her daughter.

References 

1887 births
1949 deaths
Dolgorukov family
Ladies-in-waiting from the Russian Empire
Surgeons from the Russian Empire
Russian women of World War I
Russian military personnel of World War I
Russian World War I pilots